Greeley is a center of media in north-central Colorado. The following is a list of media outlets in the city.

Print

Newspapers
The Greeley Tribune is the city's primary newspaper, published daily. In addition, Swift Communications publishes a weekly agribusiness paper, the Fence Post, in the city.

Radio
Greeley is a principal city of the Fort Collins-Greeley radio market. In its Fall 2013 ranking of radio markets by population, Arbitron ranked Fort Collins-Greeley 117th in the United States. Due to Greeley's proximity to Denver, local listeners can also receive the signal of most radio stations broadcasting from the Denver radio market.

The following is a list of radio stations that broadcast from or are licensed to Greeley.

AM

FM

Television
Greeley is in the Denver television market. Due to Greeley's proximity to Cheyenne, Wyoming, local viewers can also receive the signal of several television stations broadcasting in the Cheyenne television market.

References

Greeley